Illacme tobini is a species of millipede in the family Siphonorhinidae.
It was discovered in California at Sequoia National Park in 2016.  This millipede is part of the Illacme genus which contains only one other species known as the Illacme plenipes.

References

Further reading

 

Siphonophorida
Millipedes of North America
Endemic fauna of California
Animals described in 2016
Articles created by Qbugbot